The North Fork of the Koyukuk River is one of the principal forks of the Koyukuk River, approximately 105 mi (160 km) long, in northern Alaska in the United States. It rises on the south slopes of the Continental Divide in the Brooks Range.

It is located in the Gates of the Arctic National Park and Preserve and is part of the Koyukuk Wild and Scenic River as designated by the United States Congress in 1980.

The major tributaries include the Glacier River, Tinayguk River, Clear River and joins the Middle Fork Koyukuk River to form the Koyukuk main stem.

Robert Marshall thoroughly explored the system in 1929, naming many of the major peaks such as Mount Doonerak, Frigid Crags, and Boreal Mountain, the later two forming the Gates of the Arctic.

See also
List of rivers of Alaska
List of National Wild and Scenic Rivers

References

External links
Koyukuk Wild and Scenic River
Koyukuk National Wildlife Refuge
Explore the North Fork
Trip up the North Fork
Gates of the Arctic National Park and Preserve

Rivers of North Slope Borough, Alaska
Rivers of Alaska
Wild and Scenic Rivers of the United States
Rivers of Yukon–Koyukuk Census Area, Alaska
Brooks Range
Tributaries of the Yukon River
Rivers of Unorganized Borough, Alaska